A pneumograph, also known as a pneumatograph or spirograph, is a device for recording velocity and force of chest movements during respiration.

Principle of operation
There are various kinds of pneumographic devices, which have different principles of operation.  In one mechanism, a flexible rubber vessel is attached to the chest.  The vessel is equipped with sensors.  Others are impedance based.  In these methods, a high frequency (tens to hundreds of kHz) low amplitude current is injected across the chest cavity.  The voltage resulting from this current injection is measured and the resistance is derived from the application of Ohm's law (R = V/I).  Current flows less easily through the chest as the lungs fill, so the resistance rises with increasing lung volume.

References

External links
 Detailed article on pneumography (1905)
 Impedance-based pneumographic systems
Measuring volume and flow

Respiratory system procedures
Medical testing equipment